Merophyas calculata is a species of moth of the family Tortricidae. It is found in Australia, where it has been recorded from Tasmania. The habitat consists of open woodlands.

References

	

Moths described in 1910
Archipini